The Hawaiian Islands Invitational was an inter-confederation association football tournament that was founded in 2007, as the Pan-Pacific Championship. The tournament consisted of four teams, who contested a knock-out style competition that spanned three days.

History
When the Pan-Pacific Championship folded, due to turf issues at the Aloha Stadium, Honolulu, moves were put in place to attempt to reconstruct an inter-confederation, end of season tournament that would see some of the best teams from North American, Asia, and Australia go head to head. In March 2011, it was announced that the Hawaiian Islands Invitational would be set up, by ESPN Regional Television, Inc. in co-operation with the Hawai’i Tourism Authority and Major League Soccer.

Like the former Pan-Pacific Championships, the tournament will be held at Aloha Stadium, Honolulu, and will be broadcast live on ESPN, and ESPNs subsidiary stations.

Champions
The 2008 tournament was held in Aloha Stadium, Four teams were due to participate.
  2007 MLS Cup Champion: Houston Dynamo
  2007 J. League Cup Champion: Gamba Osaka
  2007 North American SuperLiga: Pachuca
  2007 A-League Grand Final Champion: Melbourne Victory
However, the A-League was not represented by the champion team but instead by the loser of the minor semi-final, Sydney FC. This is due to a scheduling conflict with the Grand Final on February 24, which was moved back so as not to interfere with Australia's 2010 FIFA World Cup qualification (AFC) campaign. North American SuperLiga Champions Pachuca declined to enter the tournament and were replaced with runners up Los Angeles Galaxy.

The 2009 tournament was held in Home Depot Center, Four teams participated.
  Host Team: Los Angeles Galaxy
  2008 J. League Cup Champion: Ōita Trinita
  2008 K League Champion: Suwon Bluewings
  2008 Chinese Super League Champion: Shandong Luneng Taishan

The 2012 tournament was held in Aloha Stadium, Four teams were selected. The teams come from the same confederations as the former Pan-Pacific Championships, CONCACAF and AFC. 
  Colorado Rapids – MLS
  Yokohama FC – J-League
  Busan IPark – K-League
  Melbourne Heart FC Youth Team – A-League

See also
 Sydney Festival of Football

References

External links
 Hawaiian Islands Invitational Website

Soccer in Hawaii
American soccer friendly trophies